Koran Tempo (Tempo Paper) is a daily online digital newspaper in Indonesia. It is published by PT Tempo Inti Media Harian, a part of Tempo Inti Media, which also published Tempo magazine. It was first published as a print newspaper on April 2, 2001, with a circulation of 100,000 daily.

Koran Tempo was originally published in broadsheet format, before being converted to tabloid in 2005.

Koran Tempo ceased its print publication with the last edition on 31 December 2020, citing change on newspaper readers behavior and increase of its digital version subscribers. Starting in January 2021, the paper published on digital version only, which can be accessed from the paper's website and Tempo mobile application.

References

External links
Official site
Koran Tempo ePaper

2001 establishments in Indonesia
Indonesian press
Publications established in 2001
Online newspapers with defunct print editions